Brad Smelley (born April 20, 1989) is a former American football tight end. He was drafted by the Cleveland Browns. He played college football at the University of Alabama. He also played for the Houston Texans and St. Louis Rams.

College career
He played college football at Alabama, where he started at tight end and won two NCAA National Championships. In his career, he had 54 receptions for 559 yards and four touchdowns.

Professional career

Cleveland Browns
Smelley was drafted by the Cleveland Browns in the 7th Round, 247 overall in the 2012 NFL Draft. Brad was let go from the Cleveland Browns on August 31, 2012 and signed to the practice squad. On December 10, 2012, Smelley was signed to the Cleveland Browns active roster.  On September 1, 2013, Smelley was cut by the Cleveland Browns and became a free agent.

St. Louis Rams (first stint)
Smelley was signed to the St. Louis Rams practice squad in November, but was released three days later in favor of Justice Cunningham.

Houston Texans
On December 3, 2013, Smelley signed with the practice squad of the Houston Texans. The Texans promoted him to the active roster on December 13 but was later released by the team.

St. Louis/Los Angeles Rams (second stint)
Smelley was signed by the St. Louis Rams on August 11, 2014 to fill the void left by Mason Brodine after he was placed on injured reserve. He was released during final cuts on August 29, 2014. He was signed to the Rams practice squad on September 3, 2014.

On January 6, 2016, Smelley signed a futures contract with the Rams.

References

External links
 
 

1989 births
Living people
Players of American football from Alabama
Sportspeople from Tuscaloosa, Alabama
American football tight ends
Alabama Crimson Tide football players
Cleveland Browns players
Houston Texans players
St. Louis Rams players